Dominika Mirgová (born 23 December 1991) is a Slovak singer and actress from Trnava. She first appeared at age 15 in the third season of Slovensko hľadá SuperStar (based on the British TV show Pop Idol), where she came in second. One year later, in 2008, she debuted with her first solo album.

Slovensko hľadá SuperStar performances

Singles
 2010: "Cesta snov"
 2013: "Je Koniec" (ft. Kali)
 2013: "L.A.S.K.A." (ft. Rakby)
 2013: "Swing" (ft. Mafia Corner)

Albums

 2008: Dominika Mirgová
 2012: NOVÁ
 2016: Armáda

References

1991 births
Living people
Musicians from Trnava
Actors from Trnava